Frischenschlager is a German surname. Notable people with the surname include:

 Friedhelm Frischenschlager (born 1943), Austrian politician
 Michael Frischenschlager (born 1935), Austrian violinist

German-language surnames